Nivaldo Vieira Lima (born 8 November 1977), known simply as Nivaldo, is a Brazilian former footballer who played as a midfielder.

Honours
FC Vaslui
Divizia B: 2004–05

References

1977 births
Living people
Brazilian footballers
Association football midfielders
Belgian Pro League players
Liga I players
Liga II players
K.A.A. Gent players
K.F.C. Lommel S.K. players
FC Rapid București players
FCM Bacău players
FC Vaslui players
Brazilian expatriate footballers
Expatriate footballers in Belgium
Brazilian expatriate sportspeople in Belgium
Expatriate footballers in Romania
Brazilian expatriate sportspeople in Romania
People from São Luís, Maranhão
Sportspeople from Maranhão